Sylvia Langer (born 20 August 1954) is a German former swimmer. She competed in two events at the 1972 Summer Olympics.

References

External links
 

1954 births
Living people
German female swimmers
Olympic swimmers of East Germany
Swimmers at the 1972 Summer Olympics
Sportspeople from Brandenburg